William Richardson (May 8, 1839 – March 31, 1914) was an American politician and lawyer.

Born in Athens, Alabama to William Richardson and Anne Davis, Richardson served in the Civil War, fighting for the Confederacy.

Civil War 
Richardson enlisted in Co. K, 50th Regiment Alabama Infantry and was wounded in the battle of Shiloh and was taken prisoner. He escaped from prison, was caught, and about to be shot as a spy at Murfreesboro when "on the morning air there came to our ears with heartfelt welcome the famous rebel yell," and General Forrest with his "critter company" rescued him. This account is given in Andrew Nelson Lytle's Bedford Forrest and His Horse Critters. William then joined Company E of the 50th Alabama Infantry Regiment, and was again wounded at Chickamauga. He was paroled in April 1865 in Marietta, Georgia.

Political office 
After the war, Richardson returned to Limestone County and served in the Alabama House of Representatives between 1865 and 1867 from that district. He studied law and was admitted to the bar at Huntsville in 1867. Between 1875 and 1886, he served as judge of the probate and county courts of Madison County. Richardson played a major role in the election of George Smith Houston as governor the next year. He was a delegate to the Democratic National Convention in 1904.

He was elected as a Democrat to the Fifty-sixth congress to fill the vacancy caused by the resignation of Joseph Wheeler. He was reelected to the Fifty-seventh and to the six succeeding Congresses.  He served until his death.

Personal life 
Richardson married his cousin, Elizabeth Rucker, of Lynchburg, Virginia in 1872, and they were the parents of five children.

Richardson was often troublesome to the Union victors after the Civil War.  He was wanted by the North, but was never caught.  Once, he tarred and feathered a Union carpetbagger, tied him to his horse, and dragged him through the streets of Huntsville.  He later ran to a cave and hid for about a year. Soon after, he was elected to the House.

Richardson was also very large.  He was considered a giant by many people of the time period.  Portraits of him exist which depict him seated on a large horse with his feet nearly touching the ground.  Though his actual height was never recorded, he was said to be somewhere between 6' 9" and 7' 2".

Richardson died on March 31, 1914 in Atlantic City, New Jersey, where he had gone for his health, and is buried in Maple Hill Cemetery in Huntsville.

See also 
List of United States Congress members who died in office (1900–1949)

Notes

References 
 Retrieved on 2008-02-14
 Kestenbaum, Lawrence. The Political Graveyard. Accessed December 5, 2006.

External links 
 Encyclopedia of Alabama 
 
 William N. Richardson, late a representative from Alabama, Memorial addresses delivered in the House of Representatives and Senate frontispiece 1915

1839 births
1914 deaths
19th-century American lawyers
19th-century American politicians
20th-century American politicians
Alabama lawyers
Confederate States Army soldiers
Democratic Party members of the United States House of Representatives from Alabama
Lawyers from Huntsville, Alabama
Democratic Party members of the Alabama House of Representatives
People from Athens, Alabama
Politicians from Huntsville, Alabama
Burials in Alabama